The Angelus Central European Literature Award also known as Angelus Award (Polish: Nagroda Literacka Europy Środkowej Angelus) is a Polish international literary award established in 2006 and presented by the city of Wrocław, Lower Silesia. The award is given annually for best prose books written in or translated into the Polish language by a living author originating from Central Europe whose works "undertake themes most relevant to the present day, encourage reflection and deepen the knowledge of the world of other cultures." The winners of the award receive a cash prize amounting to PLN 150,000 (€35,000) and a statuette designed by sculptor Ewa Rossano. Writers eligible for the award must come from Central European countries including Albania, Austria, Belarus, Bosnia and Herzegovina, Bulgaria, Croatia, Czech Republic, Estonia, Germany, Hungary, Latvia, Lithuania, Moldova, North Macedonia, Poland, Romania, Russia, Serbia, Slovakia, Slovenia, Ukraine.

Members of the jury selecting the laureates of the award have included Ryszard Krynicki, Mykola Riabchuk, Natalya Gorbanevskaya, Stanisław Bereś, Julian Kornhauser, Irek Grin and Krzysztof Koelher.

List of Angelus Laureates

Laureates by country

Other finalists

See also 
Silesius Poetry Award
Zbigniew Herbert International Literary Award
Polish literature

References 

Fiction awards
Non-fiction literary awards
Polish literary awards
Awards established in 2006
2006 establishments in Poland